Webb-Coleman House, also known as Christian's Post Office, is a historic home located near Chappells, Saluda County, South Carolina.  It was built between 1800 and 1825, and is a -story, five-bay, Federal style farmhouse. It has a gable roof and is sheathed in weatherboard. A one-story, frame wing was added in the mid-19th century and in 1915, a one-story, gable-roofed, frame ell and shed-roofed porch.  Also on the property are the contributing mid-to late-19th century cotton house, an early-20th century garage, an early 1930s dollhouse, and an early-20th century tenant house. The house operated as a post office from 1833 to 1844.

It was added to the National Register of Historic Places in 1992.

References

Houses on the National Register of Historic Places in South Carolina
Federal architecture in South Carolina
Houses completed in 1825
Houses in Saluda County, South Carolina
National Register of Historic Places in Saluda County, South Carolina